Wadaslintang District (formally Kecamatan Wadaslintang) is a District in Wonosobo Regency, Central Java Province Indonesia. Wadaslintang District has a postal code of 56365.

Division
Wadaslintang District has 17 villages (16 rural desa and the urban kelurahan of Wadaslintang):
 Village Kalidadap
 Village Ngalian
 Village Gumelar
 Village Somogede
 Village Trimulyo
 Village Tirip
 Village Besuki
 Village Plunjaran
 Village Lancar
 Village Panerusan
 Village Kumejing
 Village Karanganyar
 Village Erorejo
 Village Sumberejo
 Village Kaligowong
 Village Sumbersari
 Administrative village Wadaslintang

Population
According to Wonosobo Central Agency on Statistics, the populations of the villages of Wadaslintang District population at the official estimates as at mid 2021 were:

Education Facility
Education facility in Wadaslintang District:

Galleries

References

Districts of Central Java